The 7th Canadian Film Awards were announced in 1955 to honour achievements in Canadian film. Due to organizational constraints, the award organizers did not plan or stage a ceremony this year, instead announcing the winners by press release.

Winners

Film of the Year: The Stratford Adventure — National Film Board of Canada, Guy Glover producer, Morten Parker director
Theatrical Feature Length (Documentary): The Stratford Adventure — National Film Board of Canada, Guy Glover producer, Morten Parker director
Theatrical Short: Not awarded
Honorable Mention: High Tide in Newfoundland — National Film Board of Canada, Nicholas Balla producer, Grant McLean director
Non-Theatrical, Open: Riches of the Earth — National Film Board of Canada, Tom Daly producer, Colin Low director
Honorable Mention: One Little Indian — National Film Board of Canada, Tom Daly and Colin Low producers, Grant Munro director
Non-Theatrical, Government Sponsored: Gift of the Glaciers — Film and Photographic Branch, Government of Alberta, K. Hutchinson producer and director
Honorable Mention: The Homeless Ones — National Film Board of Canada, Leslie McFarlane producer and director
Non-Theatrical, Non-Government Sponsored: Where None Shall Trust — United Church of Canada, Rev. Anson C. Moorehouse producer
Honorable Mention: It's in the Cards — Crawley Films, George Gorman producer and director
Special Mentions:
Corral — National Film Board of Canada, Tom Daly producer, Colin Low director
Le Médécin du nord (Bush Doctor) — National Film Board of Canada, Roger Blais producer, Jean Palardy director
Castors du Québec (Québec Beavers) — Guernand Film Co., Fernand Guertin director
Look to the Centre — Crawley Films, Sally McDonald producer and director
Va-t-en jour — Lou Soucy producer
Tools of Plenty — PGA Films
No Time to Spare — Chetwynd Films, Arthur Chetwynd producer
On the Broom — Briston Films
Each Year They Come — Francis J. S. Holmes
The Grievance — National Film Board of Canada, Guy Glover producer, Morten Parker director
Movie Manners — University of Toronto Film Society
Nature in a City Lot — A. E. Phillips
 Amateur: Not awarded
Special Award:
Hye Bossin, Editor Canadian Film Weekly — "in recognition of his valuable contribution over the years in the field of motion pictures in Canada, and particularly his promotion of Canadian film archives"

References

Canadian
07
1955 in Canada